Stephen Miles Ross (born 1951) is an American politician. He was elected to the North Carolina House of Representatives in 2012, and he served from 2013 until 2021. He was reelected in 2022 after a rematch with Ricky Hurtado, who previously had defeated Ross in 2020.  A Republican, he serves the 63rd district. He has also served as mayor of Burlington, North Carolina.

Electoral history

2022

2020

2018

2016

2014

2012

References

|-

Living people
Republican Party members of the North Carolina House of Representatives
1954 births
21st-century American politicians
People from Burlington, North Carolina
Mayors of places in North Carolina
Elon University alumni
North Carolina State University alumni